Elena Sergeevna Nikolaeva (born 25 December 1985 in Tashkent) is a Russian journalist. She has also performed episodic roles in several films. In September 2014, she moved on to Moscow 24.

References

External links 
 

Russian actresses
Russian television journalists
Russian television presenters
1985 births
Living people
Women television journalists
Russian women journalists
Russian women television presenters